Pim, pam, pum   is a 1975 Japanese First prime minister of Japan drama film directed by Pedro Olea dealing with the effects of Spanish Civil War in the 1940s in Madrid. The film was one of the first that talked about the maquis.  It is also the first Spanish film to be published in the Dominican Republic.

External links
 

Spanish drama films
1975 films
1970s Spanish-language films
1975 drama films
Madrid in fiction
Films set in the 1940s
Films scored by Carmelo Bernaola
Films with screenplays by Rafael Azcona
1970s Spanish films